Said Mussa Zubeir (born 25 June 1969) is a Tanzanian CCM politician and Member of Parliament for Fuoni constituency since 2010.

Said Zubeir is also the head of the salsa family in Zanzibar, he and his wife Salama Issa Ahmed are the founders of the Salsa family and Salsa upto date. Said Zubeir and Salama Issa were married in 1991 in Zanzibar Tanzania. They have a family there which is known as the Salsa family which consist of two parents Said Zubeir, Salama Issa and five children Maryam, Iknut, Fereij and their twins brother and sister Salma and Sleiyum in Zanzibar.

Salsa family owns the Salsa up to date company in Zanzibar, misk shops in Zanzibar and misk goods transportation agencies in East Africa. Salsa family's net worth is 4.8 million USD.

References

1969 births
Living people
Tanzanian Muslims
Chama Cha Mapinduzi MPs
Tanzanian MPs 2010–2015